Newark Ukrainian Sitch also known as "Newark Ukrainians" (Ukrainian Sports Educational Association "Chornomorska Sitch" Newark) is an American soccer club based in Newark, New Jersey that was a member of the American Soccer League. Currently, the club participates in the Garden State Soccer League's top amateur "Super Division" under the name, "Ukrainian Sitch SC".

History
The club has had a very storied history. The club was founded on 21 December 1924.

The team debuted on August 19, 1956, competing in the "B" Division of the New Jersey State Soccer League for the 1956/57 season.  The team continued to play in the NJJSL until it joined the German-American Soccer League, and later the American Soccer League.  For the 1964/65 season, the team joined the "Super-League" Eastern Professional Soccer Conference, and after the EPSC folded at the end of its only season, the team returned to the ASL where it competed until the 1970/71 season when it joined the Schaefer League.  After the Schaefer League disbanded in the late 70s the team joined the Garden State Soccer League where it has competed in various divisions and continues to do so today.

Throughout the club's early tenure, the "Newark Ukrainians" won several competitions, tournaments and titles, the most notable being the Lewis Cup in 1962/63 & the Schaefer League in 1970/71.

During the same time, the team also played a number of friendly matches against visiting international clubs including Legia Warsaw, Poland, Dirmersheim, Karlsruhe, Germany, Skelmersdale United, West Lancashire, England, TuS Sennelager, Sennelager, Germany, and Arminia Bielefeld, Germany.

Sitch's most recent GSSL success came in the 2008/2009 season where it captured both the GSSL Semi-Pro Elite North League Title, and the GSSL League Cup.

ASL Year-by-year

Honours
American Soccer League Runner-Up: 2
1965-66, 1966–67

New Jersey Soccer League Champion: 3
1955-56, 1956–57, 1962–63

Roster

References
Notes

External links
 Футбол – Українська футбольна діаспора

Soccer clubs in New Jersey
American Soccer League (1933–1983) teams
Ukrainian association football clubs outside Ukraine
Association football clubs established in 1924
1924 establishments in New Jersey
Sports in Newark, New Jersey
Ukrainian-American culture in New Jersey